Blind Date Party is a collaborative studio album by Bill Callahan and Bonnie "Prince" Billy, released on December 10, 2021, via Drag City. The project consists of covers of other artists' songs, many of which are from the duo's Drag City labelmates.

Track listing

Charts

References 

2021 albums
Collaborative albums
Bill Callahan (musician) albums
Will Oldham albums
Drag City (record label) albums
Folk albums by American artists
Rock albums by American artists
Country albums by American artists
Covers albums